Ryan Bow (February 3, 1979) is a retired American mixed martial arts fighter from Grand Rapids, Michigan. Bow is a coach, author, and entrepreneur. He fought in both the Lightweight and Welterweight divisions and is a black belt in Kodokan Judo and Brazilian Jiu-Jitsu. Bow was taught by prominent fighters such as former five times UFC Middleweight Champion Frank Shamrock, and was a member of the American Kickboxing Academy's professional fight team.

Background

Bow was born February 3, 1979, in Grand Rapids, Michigan. When he was young he learned that he had a cyst in his brain. When Bow was 17 years old, he moved to Japan by himself with just the luggage he packed. He was a young aspiring fighter who traveled across the world to make his dream of becoming a professional mixed martial artist come true. In 1997 at the age of 18, Bow earned his black belt from the Kodokan Judo Institute, the headquarters of the world judo community.

Amateur career

Bow participated in the All Japan Amateur Shooto Championship, where he placed third. Bow was the first American to place in the top three. In Japan, there were restrictions on who could become a professional fighter; a fighter had to earn it by proving to be one of the best in the country. Fighters were required to be in the top three nationally in order to earn the right to turn pro, and Bow achieved this.

Professional career

Bow began his fighting career in what the MMA world refers to as the dark ages, at a time where eight man tournaments and a minimum of three fights per night was not only normal but expected. One organization in particular, known as Super Brawl, was willing to welcome Bow to the professional realm of MMA, and he was ready to make a statement. In 1999 Bow went on to beat all of three of his opponents in the first round. He finished his first two adversaries by armbar and his last by rear naked choke. Bow won and earned the title of the Super Brawl Lightweight Tournament Champion while fighting under MMA legend Frank Shamrock.

Bow also became the number 1 world ranked fighter in the World Shooto organization. His skills began to help him shine bright enough for him to get recognized by one of the world's fastest growing professional sport organizations, the Ultimate Fighting Championship (UFC). Bow was originally scheduled and contracted to fight Jens Pulver for the first UFC Lightweight Championship of the world but it all fell through due to the fact that Bow had a cyst in his brain and both the Nevada and New Jersey Athletic commissions were not able to license him. Bow goes into deeper detail about his medical condition in his book Tunnel Visions: Memoirs of a Mixed Martial Arts Champion.

Bow was not going to let anything stop him from pursuing his dream and goal of becoming the best mixed martial artists that he could be. He was able to find other professional MMA organizations that would allow him to strive towards his goals. Bow became a veteran in a handful of other organizations known as Shooto, Bodog Fight and DEEP where he tallied up more victories and recognition. While participating in these three organizations, Bow opened up his own gym from 2005-2009 called Kaminari Dojo Mixed Martial Arts Academy.

Retirement 
In 2009 Bow had to close his gym in Tokyo and move back to Michigan to take care of his mother. He was able to reopen his gym in the United States, but later closed it to travel and pursue other ventures. Bow retired from the sport of mixed martial arts with a record of 17-9.

After spending time in Las Vegas to learn Brazilian Jiu-jitsu and train under the BJJ world champion, Robert Drysdale, Bow accepted a job in Dubai, United Arab Emirates, as the Head MMA Coach at Team Nogueira Dubai. He and his wife moved there in September 2014. Bow earned a black belt in Brazilian Ju-Jitsu in 2016, under the guidance of former Pride and UFC Heavyweight Champion Rodrigo Nogueira and former BJJ world champion Rafael Haubert.
In 2017 Bow and his wife moved back to Seattle, where he opened Fight Gods Mixed Martial Arts Academy.

Personal life
Bow is married; his wife, Adrian, works as a veterinarian. Bow is currently working on adapting his life story for cinema. His autobiography is about the uphill battle he had to face in order to pursue his dreams to be an international MMA champion.

Championships and accomplishments

10+ years of advanced experience as an MMA instructor and 9 years as a professional MMA fighter 
2012 NAGA (North American Grappling Association) Expert Division Champion	
Former #1 world ranked fighter in 2004 under the World Shooto rankings
Former American Kickboxing Academy Fighter (AKA) who trained under 5-time UFC Middleweight Champion Frank Shamrock and trained with current UFC Heavyweight Champion Cain Valasquez, as well as Josh Koscheck, Luke Rockhold, and Josh Tompson
Fought on cards with current UFC stars: Anderson Silva (Shooto) and Chael Sonnen (BodogFight)
Trained under former Chute Boxe and Brazilian Top Team Coach, Sergio Cunha and trained alongside Judo Olympic Gold Medalists Yoshida Hidehiko and Takimoto at Yoshida Dojo in Japan
Awarded Judo Black Belt from the Kodokan, the world headquarters of Judo in Japan
1999 Hawaiian Super Brawl Tournament Champion
Trained Muay Thai in Thailand under the former Lumpinee  Stadium Champion, Santien Noi
Authored the MMA book Tunnel Visions: Memoirs of a Mixed Martial Arts Champion (2013)

Professional mixed martial arts record

| Loss||  Koichiro Matsumoto  || Decision ||Deep- 38 Impact || Oct / 23 / 2008|| 2|| 5:00|| 17-9-2
|-
| Win|| Naoki Matsushita    || Decision || Deep|| Jun / 29 / 2008|| 3|| 5:00|| 17-8-2
|-
| Draw||  Naoki Matsushita  || Draw || Deep|| Mar / 29 / 2008|| 2|| 5:00|| 16-8-2
|-
| Loss || Rodrigo Damm  || KO||  Bodog Fight - Vancouver || Aug / 24 / 2007|| 2|| 1:03|| 16-8-1
|-
| Win || Yoshihiro Tomioka   || Submission || Deep - 29 Impact|| Apr / 13 / 2007|| 3|| 3:01|| 16-7-1
|-
| Win|| Nick Agallar || Submission|| Costa Rica Regional||Feb / 17 / 2007 || 2|| :14|| 15-7-1
|-
| Win || Henrik Kakiuchi   || TKO|| MARS 6: Rapid Fire|| Dec / 22 / 2006|| 1|| 1:20|| 14-7-1
|-
| Draw || Hidehiko Hasegawa   || Draw|| Deep - 25 Impact|| Aug / 04 / 2006|| 2|| 5:00|| 13-7-1
|-
| Loss || Nobuhiro Obiya   || Decision || Deep - 24 Impact|| Apr / 11 / 2006|| 3|| 5:00|| 13-7
|-
| Win || João Batista Yoshimura || TKO||  Deep - Hero 1|| Apr / 17 / 2005|| 2|| 5:00|| 13-5
|-
| Loss || Kotetsu Boku  || Decision || Shooto - 1/29|| Jan / 29 / 2005|| 3|| 5:00|| 12-5
|-
| Win || Takumi Nakayama  || Decision||  Shooto - 7/16|| Jul / 16 / 2004|| 3|| 5:00|| 12-5
|-
| Win ||Deshaun Johnson || Submission||  SB 35 - SuperBrawl 35 || Apr / 16 / 2004|| 1|| 2:01|| 11-5
|-
| Win || Daisuke Sugie  || Decision ||  Shooto Gig Central 5|| Mar / 28 / 2004|| 3|| 5:00|| 10-5
|-
| Loss || Tatsuya Kawajiri  || TKO|| Shooto - Year End Show 2003|| Dec / 14 / 2003|| 1|| 4:21|| 9-5
|-
| Loss || Vitor Ribeiro  || Decision ||  Shooto - 5/4 || May / 04 / 2003|| 3|| 5:00|| 9-4
|-
| Loss || Joao Roque   || Decision ||  Deep - 6th Impact|| Sep / 07 / 2002|| 3|| 5:00|| 9-3
|-
| Win || Marcio Barbosa  || Decision || Barbosa Shooto - Treasure Hunt 5|| Mar / 15 / 2002|| 3|| 5:00|| 9-2
|-
| Loss || Dokonjonosuke Mishima  || Decision || Mishima Shooto - To The Top Final Act|| Dec / 16 / 2001|| 3|| 5:00|| 8-2
|-
| Win ||Kohei Yasumi  || Decision ||  Shooto - To The Top 2|| Mar / 02 / 2001|| 3|| 5:00|| 8-1
|-
| Win || Tony DeDolph  || Submission|| Shooto - To The Top 1|| Jan / 19 / 2001|| 1|| 2:21|| 7-1
|-
| Loss || Takanori Gomi  || Decision || Shooto - R.E.A.D. 12|| Nov / 12 / 2000|| 3|| 5:00|| 6-1
|-
| Win || Takaharu Murahama || Decision || Shooto - R.E.A.D. 5|| May / 22 / 2000|| 2|| 5:00|| 6-0
|-
| Win || Masato Fujiwara  || KO||  Shooto - R.E.A.D. 4|| Apr / 12 / 2000|| 1|| 2:19|| 5-0
|-
| Win || Brennan Kamaka  || Submission|| SB 12 - SuperBrawl 12|| Jun / 01 / 1999 || 1|| 1:26|| 4-0
|-
| Win || Cheyanne Padeken || Submission|| SB 11 - SuperBrawl 11|| Feb / 02 / 1999|| 1|| 3:32|| 3-0
|-
| Win || Matt Hamilton || Submission|| SB 11 - SuperBrawl 11|| Feb / 02 / 1999|| 1|| 1:05|| 2-0
|-
| Win || Erik Rysher  || Submission|| SB 11 - SuperBrawl 11|| Feb / 02 / 1999|| 1|| 1:17|| 1-0

Professional submission wrestling record

Professional kickboxing record

References

External links
Unbowed: The Blog of Ryan Bow
Professional MMA Record for Ryan Bow from Sherdog

1979 births
American male mixed martial artists
African-American mixed martial artists
Mixed martial artists utilizing judo
Mixed martial artists utilizing kickboxing
Mixed martial artists utilizing Brazilian jiu-jitsu
American male judoka
American male kickboxers
Kickboxers from Michigan
American practitioners of Brazilian jiu-jitsu
People awarded a black belt in Brazilian jiu-jitsu
Sportspeople from Grand Rapids, Michigan
21st-century African-American sportspeople
20th-century African-American sportspeople
Living people